Millbank is a historic home and archaeological site and national historic district located near Port Conway, King George County, Virginia. It encompasses 1 contributing building, 8 contributing sites, and 1 contributing structure.  Among the archaeological sites are the A. Fitzhugh Plantation Site including the smokehouse and chimney / kitchen sites; the Ballentine Site; the Brick Rubble Site; the Nail Field Site; the Old House Swamp Pointe Site; and a probable Mill Site.  The current house is an I-house dwelling built about 1900 on a basement dating to the 18th century. The plantation was initially settled in 1669; the land has been the site of residential occupation and agricultural endeavors since that time.

It was listed on the National Register of Historic Places in 2005.

References

Archaeological sites on the National Register of Historic Places in Virginia
Historic districts on the National Register of Historic Places in Virginia
Houses in King George County, Virginia
National Register of Historic Places in King George County, Virginia